Major General Vasyl Mykolayovych Osypchuk (Ukrainian: Василь Миколайович Осипчук; born in 1969), is a Ukrainian army officer who had been the acting commander of the Operational Command North in 2019.

He had also been the deputy commander of the forces of the Operational Command North of the Ground Forces of the Armed Forces of Ukraine, as a participant in the Russo-Ukrainian War. He is currently ranked as a Major General.

Biography

Vasyl Osypchuk was born in 1969. 

After the annexation of Crimea and the start of hostilities in the Donbas, he volunteered for the Military Commissariat and later headed the 10th Territorial Defense Battalion in the Zhytomyr Oblast.

In mid-July 2014, Osypchuk and his unit went to defend the demarcation line with Crimea in the Kherson Oblast. And in the winter of 2015, he found himself in the ATO zone. Subsequently, in the same year, the 59th separate motorized infantry brigade was formed on the base of the battalion, lead by Osypchuk.

On 7 July 2018, Osypchuk was the deputy commander of the Operational Command North of the Ground Forces of the Armed Forces of Ukraine.

On 3 May 2019, by presidential decree, Osypchuk was promoted to major general of the Armed Forces of Ukraine.

From August to December 2019, he was the acting commander of the Operational Command North.

References

1969 births
Living people
Ukrainian military personnel of the war in Donbas